The Boott Mills in Lowell, Massachusetts were a part of an extensive group of cotton mills, built in 1835 alongside a power canal system in this important cotton town. Their founder was Kirk Boott, one of the early mill owners in Lowell. Today, the Boott Mills complex is the most intact in Lowell and is part of Lowell National Historical Park. It houses the Boott Cotton Mills Museum.

Location
Water had been diverted through canals and locks to enable navigation, and by a simple diversion the overflow could be used to power waterwheels.

History
Kirk Boott worked for the company responsible for the Merrimack Canal the first power canal in Lowell, which was already driving other mills, and built his mills in 1835, staffing them using the Waltham-Lowell system. Running off of hydropower, the original operation consisted of four gable-roofed brick mill buildings. Eventually, floors were added, giving them flat roofs, the buildings were connected by stair towers and clock towers, and other buildings were added to the complex as well. Steam power and electric power were eventually introduced.

Decline
The New England textile industry was in decline by World War I and collapsed after World War II; the Boott Mills ceased operations in 1958. In the late 1970s, they became a key component of the Lowell National Historical Park, largely because the complex stood virtually whole, unlike other complexes which had suffered fires, or selective or wholesale demolition, like the older Merrimack Manufacturing Company. Additionally, the Boott Mill still contains buildings dating from the 1830s, as well as containing new structures, dating closer to 1900. As such, it is a catalog of industrial development over that time period.

Boott Cotton Mills Museum
The Boott Mills are now an example of adaptive re-use; they contain the National Park weave room exhibit, condos, apartments, and offices. Renovations of certain buildings still continues. A single row of Mill girl housing, built for the early operatives under the Lowell System, still stands after an extensive renovation, and features exhibits as well.

Archives and records
Boot Cotton Mills account book at Baker Library Special Collections, Harvard Business School.

See also
 Lowell mills

References

External links

Boott Cotton Mills Museum - Lowell National Historical Park

The Boott Cotton Mills of Lowell, Massachusetts

Images

Textile mills in Lowell, Massachusetts
Cotton mills in the United States
Articles containing video clips
Historic American Engineering Record in Massachusetts
Museums in Lowell, Massachusetts
Industry museums in Massachusetts
Textile museums in the United States